Bronchiolitis is inflammation of the small airways in the lungs. Acute bronchiolitis is due to a viral infection usually affecting children younger than two years of age. Symptoms may include fever, cough, runny nose, wheezing, and breathing problems. More severe cases may be associated with nasal flaring, grunting, or the skin between the ribs pulling in with breathing. If the child has not been able to feed properly, signs of dehydration may be present.

Chronic bronchiolitis is the general term used for small airways disease in adults, notably in chronic obstructive pulmonary disease.

Acute bronchiolitis is usually the result of infection by respiratory syncytial virus (72% of cases) or human rhinovirus (26% of cases). Diagnosis is generally based on symptoms. Tests such as a chest X-ray or viral testing are not routinely needed.

There is no specific treatment. Symptomatic treatment at home is generally sufficient. Occasionally, hospital admission for oxygen, support with feeding, or intravenous fluids is required. Tentative evidence supports nebulized hypertonic saline. Evidence for antibiotics, antivirals, bronchodilators, or nebulized epinephrine is either unclear or not supportive.

About 10% to 30% of children under the age of two years are affected by bronchiolitis at some point in time. It commonly occurs in the winter in the Northern Hemisphere. It is the leading cause of hospitalizations in those less than one year of age in the United States. The risk of death among those who are admitted to hospital is about 1%. Outbreaks of the condition were first described in the 1940s.

Signs and symptoms 

Bronchiolitis typically presents in children under two years old and is characterized by a constellation of respiratory symptoms that consists of fever, rhinorrhea, cough, wheeze, tachypnea and increased work of breathing such as nasal flaring or grunting that develops over one to three days. Crackles or wheeze are typical findings on listening to the chest with a stethoscope. The child may also experience apnea, or brief pauses in breathing. After the acute illness, it is common for the airways to remain sensitive for several weeks, leading to recurrent cough and wheeze.

Some signs of severe disease include:
 increased work of breathing (such as use of accessory muscles of respiration, rib & sternal retraction, tracheal tug)
 severe chest wall recession (Hoover's sign)
 presence of nasal flaring and/or grunting
 increased respiratory rate above normal
 hypoxia (low oxygen levels)
 cyanosis (bluish skin)
 lethargy and decreased activity
 poor feeding (less than half of usual fluid intake in preceding 24 hours)
 history of stopping breathing

Causes 

The term usually refers to acute viral bronchiolitis, a common disease in infancy. This is most commonly caused by respiratory syncytial virus (RSV, also known as human pneumovirus). Other agents that cause this illness include human metapneumovirus, influenza, parainfluenza, coronavirus, adenovirus, rhinovirus and mycoplasma.

Risk factors 
Children are at an increased risk for progression to severe respiratory disease if they have any of the following additional factors:
 Preterm infant (gestational age less than 37 weeks)
 Younger age at onset of illness (less than 3 months of age)
 Congenital heart disease
 Immunodeficiency
 Chronic lung disease
 Neurological disorders
 Tobacco smoke exposure

Diagnosis 

The diagnosis is typically made by clinical examination. Chest X-ray is sometimes useful to exclude bacterial pneumonia, but not indicated in routine cases. Chest x-ray may also be useful in people with impending respiratory failure. Additional testing such as blood cultures, complete blood count, and electrolyte analyses are not recommended for routine use although may be useful in children with multiple comorbidities or signs of sepsis or pneumonia.

Testing for the specific viral cause can be done but has little effect on management and thus is not routinely recommended. RSV testing by direct immunofluorescence testing on nasopharyngeal aspirate had a sensitivity of 61% and specificity of 89%. Identification of those who are RSV-positive can help for disease surveillance, grouping ("cohorting") people together in hospital wards to prevent cross infection, predicting whether the disease course has peaked yet, and reducing the need for other diagnostic procedures (by providing confidence that a cause has been identified). Identification of the virus may help reduce the use of antibiotics.

Infants with bronchiolitis between the age of two and three months have a second infection by bacteria (usually a urinary tract infection) less than 6% of the time. When further evaluated with a urinalysis, infants with bronchiolitis had a concomitant UTI 0.8% of the time. Preliminary studies have suggested that elevated procalcitonin levels may assist clinicians in determining the presence of bacterial co-infection, which could prevent unnecessary antibiotic use and costs.

Differential diagnosis 
There are many childhood illnesses that can present with respiratory symptoms, particularly persistent cough and wheezing. Bronchiolitis may be differentiated from some of these by the characteristic pattern of preceding febrile upper respiratory tract symptoms lasting for 1 to 3 days followed by the persistent cough, tachypnea, and wheezing. However, some infants may present without fever (30% of cases) or may present with apnea without other signs or with poor weight gain prior to onset of symptoms. In such cases, additional laboratory testing and radiographic imaging may be useful. The following are some other diagnoses to consider in an infant presenting with signs of bronchiolitis:
 Asthma and reactive airway disease
 Bacterial pneumonia
 Congenital heart disease
 Heart failure
 Whooping cough
 Allergic reaction
 Cystic fibrosis
 Chronic pulmonary disease
 Foreign body aspiration
 Vascular ring

Prevention 
Prevention of bronchiolitis relies strongly on measures to reduce the spread of the viruses that cause respiratory infections (that is, handwashing, and avoiding exposure to those symptomatic with respiratory infections). Guidelines are mixed on the use of gloves, aprons, or personal protective equipment. In addition to good hygiene, an improved immune system is a great tool for prevention.

One way to improve the immune system is to feed the infant with breast milk, especially during the first month of life. Respiratory infections were shown to be significantly less common among breastfed infants and fully breastfed RSV-positive hospitalized infants had shorter hospital stays than non or partially breastfed infants. Guidelines recommend exclusive breastfeeding for infants for the first 6 months of life.

Palivizumab, a monoclonal antibody against RSV, can be administered to prevent bronchiolitis to infants less than one year of age that were born very prematurely or that have underlying heart disease or chronic lung disease of prematurity. Passive immunization therapy requires monthly injections during winter. Otherwise healthy premature infants that were born after a gestational age of 29 weeks should not be administered palivizumab as the harms outweigh the benefits. Passive protection through the administration of other novel monoclonal antibodies is also under evaluation.

Immunizations for RSV are being developed but none are available currently outside of clinical trials.

Tobacco smoke exposure has been shown to increase both the rates of lower respiratory disease in infants, as well as the risk and severity of bronchiolitis. Tobacco smoke lingers in the environment for prolonged periods and on clothing even when smoking outside the home. Guidelines recommend that parents be fully educated on the risks of tobacco smoke exposure on children with bronchiolitis.

Management 
Treatment of bronchiolitis is usually focused on the hydration and symptoms instead of the infection itself since the infection will run its course and complications are typically from the symptoms themselves. Without active treatment, half of cases will go away in 13 days and 90% in three weeks. Children with severe symptoms, especially poor feeding or dehydration, may be considered for hospital admission. Oxygen saturation under 90%-92% as measured with pulse oximetry is also frequently used as an indicator of need for hospitalization. High-risk infants, apnea, cyanosis, malnutrition, and diagnostic uncertainty are additional indications for hospitalization.

Most guidelines recommend sufficient fluids and nutritional support for affected children. Measures for which the recommendations were mixed include nebulized hypertonic saline, nebulized epinephrine, and nasal suctioning. Treatments which the evidence does not support include salbutamol, steroids, antibiotics, antivirals, heliox, continuous positive airway pressure (CPAP), chest physiotherapy, and cool mist or steam inhalation.

Diet 
Maintaining hydration is an important part of management of bronchiolitis. Infants with mild pulmonary symptoms may require only observation if feeding is unaffected. However, oral intake may be affected by nasal secretions and increased work of breathing. Poor feeding or dehydration, defined as less than 50% of usual intake, is often cited as an indication for hospital admission. Guidelines recommend the use of nasogastric or intravenous fluids in children with bronchiolitis who cannot maintain usual oral intake. The risk of health care caused hyponatremia and fluid retention are minimal with the use of isotonic fluids such as normal saline, breast milk, or formula.

Oxygen 

Inadequate oxygen supply to the tissue is one of the main concerns during severe bronchiolitis and oxygen saturation is often closely associated with both the need for hospitalization and continued length of hospital stay in children with bronchiolitis. However, oxygen saturation is a poor predictor of respiratory distress. Accuracy of pulse oximetry is limited in the 76% to 90% range and there is weak correlation between oxygen saturation and respiratory distress as brief hypoxemia is common in healthy infants. Additionally, pulse oximetry is associated with frequent false alarms and parental stress and fatigue. Clinicians may choose not to given additional oxygen to children with bronchiolitis if their oxygen saturation is above 90%. Additionally, clinicians may choose not to use continuous pulse oximetry in these people.

When choosing to use oxygen therapy for a child with bronchiolitis, there is evidence that home oxygen may reduce hospitalization rate and length of stay although readmission rates and follow-up visits are increased. Also, the use of humidified, heated, high-flow nasal cannula may be a safe initial therapy to decrease work of breathing and need for intubation. However, evidence is lacking regarding the use of high-flow nasal cannula compared to standard oxygen therapy or continuous positive airway pressure. These practices may still be used in severe cases prior to intubation.

Blood gas testing is not recommended for people hospitalized with the disease and is not useful in the routine management of bronchiolitis. People with severe worsening respiratory distress or impending respiratory failure may be considered for capillary blood gas testing.

Hypertonic saline 
Guidelines recommend against the use of nebulized hypertonic saline in the emergency department for children with bronchiolitis but it may be given to children who are hospitalized.

Nebulized hypertonic saline (3%) has limited evidence of benefit and previous studies lack consistency and standardization. A 2017 review found tentative evidence that it reduces the risk of hospitalization, duration of hospital stay, and improved the severity of symptoms. The majority of evidence suggests that hypertonic saline is safe and effective at improving respiratory symptoms of mild to moderate bronchiolitis after 24 hours of use. However, it does not appear effective in reducing the rate of hospitalization when used in the emergency room or other outpatient settings in which length of therapy is brief. Side effects were mild and resolved spontaneously.

Bronchodilators 
Guidelines recommend against the use of bronchodilators in children with bronchiolitis as evidence does not support a change in outcomes with such use. Additionally, there are adverse effects to the use of bronchodilators in children such as tachycardia and tremors, as well as adding increased financial expenses.

Several studies have shown that bronchodilation with β-adrenergic agents such as salbutamol may improve symptoms briefly but do not affect the overall course of the illness or reduce the need for hospitalization. However, there are conflicting recommendations about the use of a trial of a bronchodilator, especially in those with history of previous wheezing, due to the difficulty with assessing an objective improvement in symptoms. Bronchiolitis-associated wheezing is likely not effectively alleviated by bronchodilators anyway as it is caused by airway obstruction and plugging of the small airway diameters by luminal debris, not bronchospasm as in asthma-associated wheezing that bronchodilators usually treat well.

Anticholinergic inhalers, such as ipratropium bromide, have a modest short-term effect at best and are not recommended for treatment.

Epinephrine 
The current state of evidence suggests that nebulized epinephrine is not indicated for children with bronchiolitis except as a trial of rescue therapy for severe cases.

Epinephrine is an α and β adrenergic agonist that has been used to treat other upper respiratory tract illnesses, such as croup, as a nebulized solution. A Cochrane meta-analysis in 2011 found no benefit to the use of epinephrine in the inpatient setting and suggested that there may be utility in the outpatient setting in reducing the rate of hospitalization. However, current guidelines do not support the outpatient use of epinephrine given the lack of substantial sustained benefit.

A 2017 review found inhaled epinephrine with corticosteroids did not change the need for hospitalization or the time spent in hospital. Other studies suggest a synergistic effect of epinephrine with corticosteroids but have not consistently demonstrated benefits in clinical trials. Guidelines recommend against its use currently.

Fluid therapy 
Approximately 50% of infants who are hospitalized due to bronchiolitis require fluid therapy. Some are dehydrated and others cannot be fed fluids safely by mouth. There are two main approaches to fluid therapy: intravenous (IV) fluid therapy and enteral tube fluid therapy (nasogastric or orogastric). Both approaches to fluid therapy are associated with a similar length of hospital stay. Enteral tube fluid therapy may reduce the risk of local complications, but the evidence for or against each approach is not clear.

Unclear evidence 
Currently other medications do not yet have evidence to support their use, although they have been studied for use in bronchiolitis. Experimental trials with novel antiviral medications in adults are promising but it remains unclear if the same benefit will be present.
 Surfactant had favorable effects for severely critical infants on duration of mechanical ventilation and ICU stay however studies were few and small.
 Chest physiotherapy, such as vibration or percussion, to promote airway clearance may slightly reduce duration of oxygen therapy but there is a lack of evidence that demonstrates any other benefits. People with difficulty clearing secretions due to underlying disorders such as spinal muscle atrophy or severe tracheomalacia may be considered for chest physiotherapy.
 Suctioning of the nares may provide temporarily relief of nasal congestion but deep suctioning of the nasopharynx has been shown prolong length of hospital stay in infants. Upper airway suctioning may be considered in people with respiratory distress, feeding difficulties, or infants presenting with apnea.
 Heliox, a mixture of oxygen and the inert gas helium, may be beneficial in infants with severe acute RSV bronchiolitis who require CPAP but overall evidence is lacking.
 DNAse has not been found to be effective but might play a role in severe bronchiolitis complicated by atelectasis.
 There are no systematic reviews or controlled trials on the effectiveness of nasal decongestants, such as xylometazoline, for the treatment of bronchiolitits.
 Overall evidence is insufficient to support the use of alternative medicine. There is tentative evidence for Chinese herbal medicine, vitamin D, N-acetylcysteine, and magnesium but this is insufficient to recommend their use.

Non-effective treatments 
 Ribavirin is an antiviral drug which does not appear to be effective for bronchiolitis.
 Antibiotics are often given in case of a bacterial infection complicating bronchiolitis, but have no effect on the underlying viral infection and their benefit is not clear. The risks of bronchiolitis with a concomitant serious bacterial infection among hospitalized febrile infants is minimal and work-up and antibiotics are not justified. Azithromycin adjuvant therapy may reduce the duration of wheezing and coughing in children with bronchiolitis but has not effect on length of hospital stay or duration of oxygen therapy.
 Corticosteroids, although useful in other respiratory disease such as asthma and croup, have no proven benefit in bronchiolitis treatment and are not advised. Additionally, corticosteroid therapy in children with bronchiolitis may prolong viral shedding and transmissibility. The overall safety of corticosteroids is questionable.
 Leukotriene inhibitors, such as montelukast, have not been found to be beneficial and may increase adverse effects.
 Immunoglobulins are of unclear benefit.

Epidemiology 

Bronchiolitis typically affects infants and children younger than two years, principally during the autumn and winter. It is the leading cause of hospital admission for respiratory disease among infants in the United States and accounts for one out of every 13 primary care visits. Bronchiolitis accounts for 3% of emergency department visits for children under 2 years old. Bronchiolitis is the most frequent lower respiratory tract infection and hospitalization in infants worldwide.

References

External links 
 Bronchiolitis. Patient information from NHS Choices
     from the Scottish Intercollegiate Guidelines Network
 

Animal viral diseases
Inflammations
Pediatrics
Acute lower respiratory infections
Coronavirus-associated diseases
Wikipedia medicine articles ready to translate